Langa Langa Stars were a popular DR Congo soukous band in the 1980s. The band had the peculiarity of featuring as much as seven lead vocalists, nicknamed the "6 Patrons of Langa Langa Stars".

Langa Langa Stars were founded in 1981 as a spin-off of Papa Wemba's band Viva La Musica, which in turn may be described as a spin-off of the seminal soukous band Zaiko Langa Langa; it can thus be classified in the so-called "Clan Langa Langa", a large set of soukous bands that are directly or indirectly derivative of Zaiko. The "6 Patrons" were Esperant Djenga Ka, Djuna Djanana, Dindo Yogo (all 3 of them ex-Viva La Musica), Evoloko Jocker, Djo Mali and Bozi Boziana (all 3 ex-Zaiko Langa Langa). In the early 1980s the Langa Langa Stars were one of the most popular soukous band in Congo. Their dance style sansaku became a craze of the times. Members began leaving in 1983, and by 1984 of the original seven only Evoloko Jocker was left.  He continued to lead the band with new members, but by the end of the 1980s Langa Langa Stars was a name that Evoloko used under which to present what were essentially solo albums with session musicians.

Partial discography
 Requiem (1983)
 Avenir Mbeya (1983)
 Rencontre (Pablo/Zaiko; Bozi/Langa)(1984)
 Likombe (1985)
 Moyeko (with Choc Stars) (1985)
 Bouquet Des Flores (1985)
 Soleil (1985)
 Eliyo (1985)
 Evolvo Jocker; La Carte qui Gagne (1986)
 Evolvo Jocker; Done Bis (1987)
 Les meilleurs succès de Langa Langa Stars vol. 1, Veve International 2007
 Les meilleurs succès de Langa Langa Stars vol. 2, Veve International 2008
 Les meilleurs succès de Langa Langa Stars vol. 3, Veve International 2008
 Les meilleurs succès de Langa Langa Stars vol. 4, Veve International 2008

References
 Martin Sinnock, Bozi-Boziana: Zaiko to Anti-Choc With a String of Beautiful Women at Africa Sounds

Democratic Republic of the Congo musical groups